A canonical inquisition is an official enquiry in the Roman Catholic Church conducted according to canon law.

References

Catholic canonical structures
Inquiry
Tribunals of the Catholic Church